Saleh Bashir Al Dosari (born 22 July 1980) is a retired Saudi Arabian footballer. He famously played for Al-Ettifaq and the  Saudi Arabia national team.

Bashir has made several appearances for the Saudi Arabia national football team, including his play at the 2007 Asian Nations Cup finals.

Honours

International
Saudi Arabia
Islamic Solidarity Games: 2005

References

External links
 

Living people
1980 births
Saudi Arabian footballers
Association football forwards
Ettifaq FC players
Khaleej FC players
Al-Nahda Club (Saudi Arabia) players
Saudi First Division League players
Saudi Professional League players
Saudi Arabia international footballers